Gangaur (ISO 15919: Gaṇagaura ) is a Hindu festival celebrated in the Indian state of Rajasthan, Haryana, Malwa and Nimaad regions (Barwani, Khargone, Khandwa etc.) of Madhya Pradesh and Braj and Bundelkhand regions in Uttar Pradesh and Madhya Pradesh. It is also celebrated in some parts of Gujarat and West Bengal.

Gangaur is colorful and one of the most important festivals of the people of Rajasthan and is observed throughout the state with great fervor and devotion by womenfolk who worship Goddess Gauri, the wife of Lord Shiva during the month of Chaitra (March–April). It is the celebration of spring, harvest, marital fidelity, conjugal blessedness and childbearing.

Gana is a synonym for Lord Shiva and Gaur which stands for Gauri or Parvati who symbolizes Saubhagya (marital bliss). The unmarried women worship her for being blessed with a good husband, while married women do so for the welfare, health, and long life of their husbands and happy married life. People from Rajasthan when migrated to Kolkata in West Bengal continued celebrating Gangaur. This celebration is now more than 100 years old in Kolkata. The 2022 date for the festival is 18 March.

Rites and Rituals
The festival commences on the first day of chaitra, the day following Holi, and continues for 16 days. For a newly-wedded girl, it is binding to observe the full course of 18 days of the festival that succeeds her marriage. Even unmarried girls fast for the full period of 16 days and eat only one meal a day.
Festivity consummates on 3rd day of Shukla paksha of Chaitra Month. Fairs (Gangaur Melas) are held throughout the 18-day period.
Numerous folklores are associated with Gangaur which makes this festival deeply ingrained into the hearts of Rajasthan, and parts of Madhya Pradesh, Haryana & Gujarat.

Images and Paintings
Images of Isar and Parvati are made of clay for the festival. In some Rajput families, permanent wooden images are painted afresh every year by reputed painters called matherans on the eve of festival. A distinct difference between the idols of Teej and Gangaur is that the Idol will have a canopy during the Teej festival while the Gangaur idol would not have a canopy.

Mehandi
The ladies decorate their hands and feet by drawing designs with Mehndi (myrtle paste). The figures drawn range from the Sun, Moon and the starts to simple flowers or geometrical designs. Ghudlias are earthen pots with numerous holes all around and a lamp lit inside them. On the evening of the 7th day after Holi, unmarried girls go around singing songs of ghudlia carrying the pots with a burning lamp inside, on their heads. On their way, they collect small presents of cash, sweets, jaggery, ghee, oil etc. this continues for 10 days i.e. up to the conclusion of the Gangaur festival when the girls break their pots and throw the debris into the well or a tank and enjoys a feast with the collection made.

Vrat katha 
Once upon a time, Lord Shiv, along Goddess Parvati and Narad Muni went out to take a small trip. When they reached a nearby forest, the news of their arrival spread like wild fire. As the women were busy preparing a gorgeous spread for the Gods and Goddess, the women of the low class came with their offerings. Lord Shiv and Goddess Parvati happily ate the food and Goddess sprinkled the "suhagras" on them.

After a certain time, the women of the high classes came with the food they had prepared. When they had finished eating Lord Shiv asked his wife that with what was she going to bless the women as she had already completely finished the "suhagras" on blessing the women of lower classes. To this, Goddess Parvati replied that she intended to bless these women with her own blood. Saying so, she scratched the tip of her finger and sprinkled the blood on these women.

Gauri's Departure
The festival reaches its climax during the last three days. The images of Gauri and Isar are dressed in new garments especially made for the occasion. Unmarried girls and married women decorate the images and make them look like living figures.

At an auspicious hour in the afternoon, a procession is taken out to a garden, bawdi or johad or well with the images of Isar and Gauri, placed on the heads of married women. Songs are sung about the departure of Gauri to her husband's house. The procession comes back after offering water to the first two days. On the final day, she faces in the same direction as Isar and the procession concludes in the consignment of the all images in the waters of a tank or a well. The women bid farewell to Gauri and turn their eyes and the Gangaur festival comes to an end.

Gangaur at Jaipur

The Gangaur of Jaipur is famous in all over the world. In Jaipur, a sweet dish called a ghewar is characteristic of the Gangaur festival. People buy ghewar to eat and distribute it among their friends and relatives. A procession, with the image of Gauri, commences from the Zanani-Deodhi of the City Palace. It then passes through Tripolia Bazaar, Chhoti Chaupar, Gangauri Bazaar, Chaugan stadium and finally converge near the Talkatora. People from all walks of life come to witness the procession.

Gangaur at Udaipur
Udaipur has the privilege of having a dedicated Ghat named after Gangaur. Gangaur Ghat or Gangori Ghat is situated on the waterfront of Lake Pichola. This ghat serves as prime location for celebration of multiple festivals, including Gangaur festival. Traditional processions of Gangaur commences from the City Palace, and several other places, which passes through various areas of the city. The procession is headed by an old palanquins, chariots, bullock carts and performance by folk artistes. After the processions are complete, the idols of Gan and Gauri are brought to this ghat and immersed in the Lake Pichola from here.

See also 

 Gaura Parva, a similar festival celebrated in Nepal and Indian state of Uttarakhand

References

 https://www.ifside.com

External links

Gangour: Feel the essence of Mewar
Gangaur: Rajasthan Hindu Harvest Festival
 Gangaur Festival in Kolkata
 Gangaur, and the stories of Gauri (Goddess Parvati) and Mahadevji (Lord Shiva)
  Making of Gangaur idol
 Gangaur: Festival in Nimaad

Festivals in Rajasthan
March observances
April observances

Hindu festivals